Events from the year 1865 in Canada.

Incumbents

Crown 
 Monarch – Victoria

Federal government
Parliament — 8th

Governors
Governor General of the Province of Canada — Charles Monck, 4th Viscount Monck 
Colonial Governor of Newfoundland — Anthony Musgrave
Governor of New Brunswick — Arthur Charles Hamilton-Gordon
Governor of Nova Scotia — Charles Hastings Doyle then Richard Graves MacDonnell then Sir William Fenwick Williams
Governor of Prince Edward Island — George Dundas

Premiers
Joint Premiers of the Province of Canada –
John Alexander Macdonald, Canada West Premier
Étienne-Paschal Taché then Narcisse-Fortunat Belleau, Canada East Premier 
Premier of Newfoundland — Hugh Hoyles then Frederick Carter
Premiers of New Brunswick — Samuel Leonard Tilley then Albert James Smith
Premiers of Nova Scotia – Charles Tupper
Premier of Prince Edward Island – John Hamilton Gray then James Colledge Pope

Events
February 3 – Legislature approves message to Crown for union of British North America provinces.
February 20 – The Legislature of the Province of Canada passes a motion in favour of Confederation.
March 7 – New Brunswick rejects a Confederation scheme.
March 24 – Macdonald, Brown, Cartier, and Galt appointed to negotiate Confederation in London.
May 9 – American Civil War ends
May 10 – An Admiralty letter to the Colonial Office required colonial warships to "wear a Union Jack in the usual place, and the White Ensign, with either the Arms of the Colony, or such other distinguishing mark as may be chosen by the Colony, and approved by the Colonial Office and the Lords Commissioners of the Admiralty". This regulation was mainly directed at Australia and not applicable to Canada, which had no Navy at that time.
October 20 – Proclamation of Ottawa as seat of government.
November 7 – 1865 Newfoundland general election
December 16 – A distinctive Blue Ensign for the province of Canada is authorized by the UK secretary of state for the colonies.
December 22 – Colonial Office Circular notifying revised Admiralty requirements for flags for colonial warships and for other colonial government vessels and requesting correct drawings of seals or badges to be adopted as distinguishing marks.

Births
January 7 – Lyman Duff, jurist and Chief Justice of Canada (died 1955)
February 10 – Richard Gardiner Willis, politician (died 1929)
February 28 – Wilfred Grenfell, medical missionary (died 1940)
March 15 – Edith Maude Eaton, author (died 1914)
April 10 – Jack Miner, conservationist (died 1944)
May 31 – Clarence Chant, astronomer and physicist (died 1956)
July 16 – George Bowlby, physician and surgeon, military officer, and mayor of Berlin, Ontario (died 1916)
August 10 – James Wilson Morrice, painter (died 1924)
November 17 – John Stanley Plaskett, astronomer (died 1941)
December 25 – James Breakey, politician (died 1952)
December 30 — Emily Julian McManus poet, author, and educator (died 1918)

Full date unknown
James Endicott, church leader and missionary (died 1954)

Deaths
January 16 – Joseph Cunard, merchant, shipbuilder and politician (born 1799)
July 27 – Augustin-Norbert Morin, lawyer, judge, politician and Joint Premier of the Province of Canada (born 1803)
July 30 – Étienne-Paschal Taché, doctor, politician, and deputy adjutant-general of the militia (born 1795)
August 27 – Thomas Chandler Haliburton, author, judge and politician (born 1796)

Historical documents
Confederation Canada must be aware of might of United States 

U.S. Congress resolves to withdraw from treaty limiting navies on Great Lakes

Powerful British MP Benjamin Disraeli says Britain would be foolish to lose Canada 

U.S. ambassador reports British seem less defensive 

Governor General orders flags flown at half-mast following President Lincoln's assassination

Arrest on U.S.A.-bound Canadian ship of man ready to kill "Yankees" 

Province of Canada law requires prostitutes available to sailors and soldiers to report for medical inspection if summoned

References

 
Canada
Years of the 19th century in Canada
1865 in North America